David Casinos Sierra (born 15 February 1972 in Valencia) is a Paralympian athlete from Spain competing mainly in category F11 shot put events.

Personal 
Casinos was born 15 February 1972 from Valencia.  He is married to Celia Maestre Martín, and the pair were dating in 2004.

In 2013, he was awarded the gold Real Orden al Mérito Deportivo, at a ceremony at the Teatro de Madrid Cofidis, and attended by Princess Elena, Minister of Education, Culture and Sport, José Ignacio Wert, the president of the Higher Sports Council (CSD), Miguel Cardinal, and the Director General of Sports of CSD, Ana Muñoz. In November 2013, he participated in Universal Children's Day celebration in Madrid by presenting a book to the Supreme Council of Sports.

Athletics 
Maestre became David Casinos guide in 2002.

In 2002, he competed in the Valencia Athletics Open, which was organized by the Federació d'Esports Adaptats de la Comunitat Valenciana (FESA).  He qualified for and competed in the 2011 IPC Athletics World Championships where he was one of thirty-two competitors representing Spain. He competed in the 2012 Spanish national championships held in the Basque country, where he set a Paralypic B qualifying standard in the shot put with a distance of 13.10 meters. In 2012, he was a recipient of a Plan ADO €23,000 athlete scholarship with a €3,000 reserve and a €2,500 coaching scholarship. His ability to compete at the highest level was also made possible because of sponsorships from groups like Council of the City of Valencia and Moncada.
In May 2013, he competed in the Spanish national championships, where he earned a gold medal in the shot put and another in the discus. Prior to the start of the London Games, he trained with several other visually impaired Spanish track and field athletes in Logroño. In July 2013, he participated in the 2013 IPC Athletics World Championships.

Paralympics 
Casinos is a four-time Paralympic gold medalist in the shot put having won the F11 class in 2000 and  2004 and the combined F11/12 class in  2008.  He also competed in the discus in 2000, 2004 and 2008 Paralympics.  He competed at the 2012 Summer Paralympics where he finished first in the discus and fifth in the shot put.

He was the flag bearer for the Spanish team at the 2008 Games.

Maestre was guide for Casinos at the 2004 Summer Paralympics. At the time, they were dating and broke Paralympic taboo by sharing a room together in the Paralympic village. Maestre was a guide at the 2008 Summer Paralympics in athletics for Casinos, where they won a gold medal.

Results

Notes

References

External links 
 
 
 
 

1972 births
Living people
Spanish disability athletes
Paralympic athletes of Spain
Paralympic gold medalists for Spain
Paralympic athletes with a vision impairment
Paralympic medalists in athletics (track and field)
Athletes (track and field) at the 2000 Summer Paralympics
Athletes (track and field) at the 2004 Summer Paralympics
Athletes (track and field) at the 2008 Summer Paralympics
Athletes (track and field) at the 2012 Summer Paralympics
Athletes (track and field) at the 2016 Summer Paralympics
Medalists at the 2000 Summer Paralympics
Medalists at the 2004 Summer Paralympics
Medalists at the 2008 Summer Paralympics
Medalists at the 2012 Summer Paralympics
Medalists at the 2016 Summer Paralympics
World record holders in Paralympic athletics
Plan ADOP alumni
Spanish male discus throwers
Spanish male shot putters
Visually impaired discus throwers
Visually impaired shot putters
Paralympic discus throwers
Paralympic shot putters
Spanish blind people